Audley Richards (24 February 1960 – 10 April 2003) was a British bobsledder. He competed in the four man event at the 1988 Winter Olympics.

References

External links
 

1960 births
2003 deaths
British male bobsledders
Olympic bobsledders of Great Britain
Bobsledders at the 1988 Winter Olympics
Sportspeople from Bristol